The 1949 Calgary Stampeders finished in 1st place in the W.I.F.U. with a 13–1 record. They appeared in the Grey Cup and attempted to repeat as champions but they lost to the Montreal Alouettes. On October 22, 1949, the Stampeders recorded their first loss in almost two years (last loss was October 27, 1947) against the Saskatchewan Roughriders. They established a CFL record for the most consecutive regular season wins with a 22-game winning streak from August 25, 1948, to October 22, 1949.

Regular season

Season standings

Season schedule

Playoffs

Finals

 Calgary won the total-point series by 22–21. The Stampeders will advance to the Grey Cup game.

Grey Cup

References

Calgary Stampeders seasons
N. J. Taylor Trophy championship seasons
1949 Canadian football season by team